Benin National Olympic and Sports Committee (IOC code: BEN) is the National Olympic Committee representing Benin. It was created on 5 May 1962 and recognized by the International Olympic Committee in June 1962.

History
In February 1962, the Secretary of the IOC was informed of a plan to create a National Olympic Committee in Dahomey. On 5 May 1962, representatives of seven national sport federations (athletics, basketball, boxing, cycling, football, volleyball and tennis) formed the Dahoman National Olympic Committee. The Presidents of the Athletics and Volleyball Federations, Mr. Justin Durand and Mr. Adolphe Santos, became President and Secretary General respectively of the new NOC. A few weeks later in June at the 59th Session of the International Olympic Committee held in Moscow, the members granted the committee official recognition.

Presidents of Committee
 1962–1981 – Justin Durand
 1981–1982 – Dr. Soule Dankoro
 1982–present – Marius Francisco

See also
 Benin at the Olympics

References

Benin
 
1962 establishments in the Republic of Dahomey
Olympic
Sports organizations established in 1962